State Route 189 (SR 189, OH 189) is a  long state highway in the northwestern portion of the U.S. state of Ohio. SR 189 runs entirely within Putnam County and is entirely a two-lane highway.

The SR 189 designation was applied in the early 1920s. The designation was on  a route that was to the south of the current. In the mid 1920s SR 189 was rerouted onto its current route between Fort Jennings and Vaughnsville. The route was extended to Ottoville in the early 1930s.

Route description

SR 189 begins at a three-way intersection, in Ottoville, with SR 66 entering from the south and US 224 and SR 66 entering from the west. SR 189 heads east concurrent with US 224, passing through residential and commercial properties.  Here, SR 189 has its highest traffic counts; within the 2011 ODOT survey, the road is listed with an average annual daily traffic(AADT) of 3,930 vehicles on a section of highway that is concurrent with US 224. US 224 turns north and SR 189 continues easterly. The route passes through residential properties, before curving towards the southeast. After curving towards the southeast, the route leaves the village of Ottoville and the road passes through farmland. The highway enters the village of Fort Jennings, passing through residential properties. The highway has a T-intersection with SR 190.

At the T-intersection, SR 189 turns towards the southwest, concurrent with SR 190. The road passes through commercial properties, before the concurrency ends with SR 189 turning towards the southeast. SR 189 crosses the Auglaize River and leaves the village of Fort Jennings. The road heads east-southeast through farmland as a two-lane highway. The highway cross over the Ottawa River and enters Rimer. SR 189 makes a sharp curve towards the south, followed by a sharp curve towards the east. The road makes another sharp curve towards the south, after leaving Rimer the road curves towards the southeast, paralleling the Ottawa River. As the river curves towards the south, SR 189 curves due east. SR 189 heads east towards Vaughnsville, the AADT drops to 330 vehicles through this section of road. In Vaughnsville, SR 189 has an intersection with SR 115. Continuing east after SR 189 ends is SR 12. There are no segments of SR 189 that are included as a part of the National Highway System (NHS).

History
The SR 189 designation was applied in 1923. It was originally routed from Columbus Grove to the former SR 5 near Delphos, concurrent with SR 106 east of SR 115. In 1924, SR 189 that was concurrent with SR 106 was removed. SR 189 was rerouted in 1925, to it current route between SR 190 and SR 115.  Then, in 1932, the road was extended from SR 190 to SR 66 in Ottoville.

Major intersections

References

External links

189
189